Dicranella varia is a species of moss belonging to the family Dicranaceae. It is native to Eurasia and South America.

References

Dicranales